Vaugine Township is a township in Jefferson County, in the U.S. state of Arkansas. The township is named for Major Francis Vaugine, a 19th-century landowner. Its population was 41,374 as of the 2020 census. The only city is Pine Bluff, the county seat.

References

Arkansas populated places on the Arkansas River
Townships in Jefferson County, Arkansas